Lieutenant-Colonel Samuel Glenholme Lennox Bradley  (1869–1930s) was a British soldier of the Boer War and First World War.

References

External links 

http://queenswestminsterrifles.blogspot.com/2013/10/2nd-lieutenant-samuel-bradley-dcm.html

British Army personnel of World War I
1869 births
1930s deaths
British Army personnel of the Second Boer War
Companions of the Distinguished Service Order
Recipients of the Military Cross
Recipients of the Distinguished Conduct Medal
London Regiment officers
London Regiment soldiers